Maximilian Bauer (born 9 February 2000) is a German professional footballer who plays as a defender for  club FC Augsburg.

Club career
On 2 February 2022, Bauer signed a five-year contract with FC Augsburg, effective from 1 July 2022.

References

External links
 
 Profile at kicker.de
 

2000 births
Living people
German footballers
Germany youth international footballers
Germany under-21 international footballers
Association football defenders
SpVgg Greuther Fürth II players
SpVgg Greuther Fürth players
FC Augsburg players
Bundesliga players
2. Bundesliga players
Regionalliga players
21st-century German people